Piletocera costifascialis is a moth in the family Crambidae. It was described by George Hampson in 1917. It is found in Malaysia.

References

costifascialis
Endemic fauna of Malaysia
Moths of Malaysia
Moths described in 1917
Taxa named by George Hampson